Zoltán Palancsa (born 7 October 1963) is a Hungarian male curler and curling coach.

Teams and events

Men's

Mixed

Record as a coach of national teams

Personal life
His children are also a curlers: daughter Dorottya is a two-time , son Peter is a curler and coach.

References

External links

Living people
1963 births
Sportspeople from Zala County
Hungarian male curlers

Hungarian curling coaches